

Headline Event of the Year
Murderers' Row lead New York Yankees to World Series victory.
Babe Ruth hits 60 home runs.

Champions
 World Series: New York Yankees over Pittsburgh Pirates (4–0)
 Negro World Series: Chicago American Giants over Bacharach Giants (5–3–1)

Awards
League Award
Lou Gehrig (AL)
Paul Waner (NL)

Statistical leaders

Major league baseball final standings

American League final standings

National League final standings

Negro leagues final standings

Negro National League final standings

Chicago won the first half, Birmingham won the second half.
Chicago beat Birmingham 4 games to 0 games in a play-off.

Eastern Colored League final standings

†Homestead was not in the league, but these games counted in the standings.
Atlantic City won both first and second halves.

Events

January
January 27 – Accused of having fixed a game between the Detroit Tigers and Cleveland Indians during the  season, Ty Cobb and Tris Speaker are forced to resign from their respective teams by baseball commissioner Kenesaw Mountain Landis. Cobb will be assigned to the Philadelphia Athletics by Detroit, while Speaker will sign as a free agent with the Washington Senators.
January 31 – Tris Speaker makes his debut with the Washington Senators.

February
February 8 – Ty Cobb joins the Philadelphia Athletics.
February 9 – The Cincinnati Reds trade center fielder Edd Roush to the New York Giants in exchange by first baseman George Kelly.

March

April
April 12 :
U.S. President Calvin Coolidge throws out the first ball in Washington, D.C. as the Washington Senators lost to the Boston Red Sox, 6–2.
Future Hall of famer Lloyd Waner makes his major league debut at left field for the Pittsburgh Pirates. His younger brother, Paul, is at right field in the Pirates' 2–1 victory over the Cincinnati Reds.
April 15 – Babe Ruth hits a solo home run against Howard Ehmke of the Philadelphia Athletics in the first inning. It is Babe's first of the year. The New York Yankees win, 6–3.

May
May 3 :
Jesse and Virgil Barnes became the first brothers in Major League Baseball history to pitch against each other. Virgil prevailed, as the New York Giants defeated Jesse and the Brooklyn Robins, 7–6.
The Pittsburgh Pirates scored a run in the eighth inning and two in the ninth to come from behind and defeat the St. Louis Cardinals 11–10, moving into a tie for first place in the National League.
May 7 – Lou Gehrig christened the new right field pavilion at Chicago's Comiskey Park by parking a ninth inning grand slam, as the New York Yankees beat the Chicago White Sox 8–0.
May 10 – In Detroit, it's Ty Cobb Day and more than 30,000 pay to see the Detroit Tigers legend in his first appearance at Navin Field in a Philadelphia Athletics uniform. With Eddie Collins on base in the first inning, Cobb drives a double into the overflow crowd to send home Collins for the first run of the game, though the Athletics would eventually beat the Tigers 6–3.
May 11 – For the second day in a row, a baseball legend faces his former team for the first time in his career, when Rogers Hornsby leads the New York Giants to a 10–1 victory over the St. Louis Cardinals at the Polo Grounds. Hornsby hits a home run and collects five runs batted in.
May 14 – In his first game against his former team, Philadelphia Athletics center fielder Tris Speaker is held hitless by Indians pitcher George Uhle in four at-bats.
May 16 – At Sportsman's Park, 40-year-old Ty Cobb hits a home run in the seventh inning of the Philadelphia Athletics' 10–8 victory over the St. Louis Browns.
May 22 – The New York Yankees are in high spirits on the road as they beat the host Cleveland Indians at League Park, 7–2, with Babe Ruth hitting his 10th home run of the young season. Ruth's homer is described as a popup that goes over the fence. The Yankees, who wear Indian headdresses during the game, now lead the American League by four and a half games.
May 30 – In the first game of a doubleheader, Chicago Cubs shortstop Jimmy Cooney turns the sixth unassisted triple play in Major League history during the fourth inning of a 5–4 loss to the Pittsburgh Pirates.
May 31 – For the first time in Major League history, an unassisted triple play is turned on consecutive days. This time the trick was turned by Detroit Tigers first baseman Johnny Neun, for the seventh time in major league history, during a 1–0 win over the Cleveland Indians.
Babe Ruth homers for the fourth consecutive game in the fifth inning of the nightcap in Shibe Park. Ruth, who hits his 15th blast against Jack Quinn and his 16th off Howard Ehmke, finishes the month of May with 12 round-trippers. The Yankees lose the opener, 10–3, as the Athletics' Jimmie Foxx hits the first of his 524 major league career home run, which it comes off Yankees pitcher Urban Shocker.

June
June 8 - Tony Lazzeri produces the first regular-season three home run game in New York Yankees history to help savage an 11-inning, 12–11 victory over the Chicago White Sox at Yankee Stadium. Lazzeri drives in five runs from his three homers, the last two with his third, which caps a five-run rally to tie the game in  the ninth inning.
June 11 – At League Park, Babe Ruth hits his 19th and 20th home runs of the season against Cleveland Indians left-hander Garland Buckeye. The Yankees win, 6–4.
June 12 – For the second day in a row, the Brooklyn Robins defeat the Pittsburgh Pirates by a score of 11–10.
June 16 – The Chicago Cubs defeat the visiting Philadelphia Phillies, 7–2, to complete a twelve-game winning streak to move within a game of first place in the National League.

July
July 4 – In a doubleheader, the New York Yankees beat the visiting Washington Senators 12–1 and 21–1, prompting Senators first baseman Joe Judge to say, "Those fellows not only beat you but they tear your heart out. I wish the season was over."
July 5 – The Boston Red Sox defeat the Philadelphia Athletics at Fenway Park, 6–5, to end a fifteen-game losing streak.
July 9 – Detroit Tigers first baseman Johnny Neun steals five bases in a 14–4 victory over the New York Yankees at Navin Field.
July 13 – Johnny Neun of the Detroit Tigers steals home in both games of a doubleheader with the Washington Senators at Navin Field. Detroit won both games, 7–3 and 13–9.
July 24 – Babe Ruth hits his 31st home run of the season and his first of 1927 at Comiskey Park. Ruth now has homered in every American League ballpark. The homer, off pitcher Tommy Thomas, breaks a 12-day drought for the Bambino. The Yanks win the game, 3–2.

August
August 16 – At Comiskey Park, Babe Ruth hits a home run against Chicago White Sox pitcher Tommy Thomas. The New York Yankees win the game, 8–1. It is Ruth's 37th of the season, but he trails Lou Gehrig, who has 38.

September
September 3 :
The New York Yankees are shut out for the only time all season by Lefty Grove and the Philadelphia Athletics.
Tied for first place, the Pittsburgh Pirates sweep a two-game series from the St. Louis Cardinals. They maintain sole possession of first place for the remainder of the season.
September 4 – At Shibe Park in Philadelphia, Babe Ruth hits his 400th career home run and his 44th of the year. The landmark homer comes against Rube Walberg in a 12–2 Yankees win.
September 5 – The Boston Red Sox beat the New York Yankees 12–11 in eighteen innings.
September 6 – Babe Ruth and the Yankees come to Fenway Park for a doubleheader. In game 1, Ruth hits his 45th and 46th home runs of the year against Tony Welzer, and the Yankees win, 14–2. One of Ruth's round-trippers clears the center-field fence and is reputedly the longest ever hit at Fenway. In game 2, the Red Sox win, 5–2, despite Ruth's 47th home run, hit against Jack Russell.
September 7 – Babe Ruth follows up on his three-homer day at Fenway Park with two more. Against Danny MacFayden, Ruth hits his 48th and later cracks number 49 against Slim Harriss. The Yankees win, 12–10, and Ruth now has 8 home runs at Fenway Park.
September 11 – Back At Yankee Stadium, Babe Ruth continues his home run barrage. He hits number 50, this one against Milt Gaston of the Browns; the Yankees lose nonetheless, 6–2.
September 13 – A big day for the Yankees and Babe Ruth. In a doubleheader against the Indians, Ruth hits his 51st home run against Willis Hudlin and his 52nd off Joe Shaute. The Yankees win both games by the score of 5–3 and clinch the AL pennant in their 139th game of the season. In addition, Waite Hoyt wins his 20th game.
September 18 – At Yankee Stadium, New York sweeps the Chicago White Sox in a doubleheader, 2–1 and 5–1. In the nightcap, against pitcher Ted Lyons, Babe Ruth hits his 54th home run of the year. Besides, Lou Gehrig weighs in with his third grand slam of 1927.
September 22 – At Yankee Stadium, Babe Ruth homers against Detroit Tigers pitcher Ken Holloway for his 56th of the season. Earl Combs hits three consecutive triples, as the Yankees win, 8–7.
September 27 – Babe Ruth hit a grand slam against Lefty Grove of the Philadelphia Athletics. it is Ruth's 57th home run of the season. The Yankees win, 7–4.
September 29 – Babe Ruth of the New York Yankees hits two homers to tie his own  record of 59 home runs as the Yankees beat the Washington Senators, 15–4.
September 30 – With the score tied 2–2 in the eighth inning, and a runner on third, Babe Ruth hits his 60th home run of the season off Washington Senators pitcher Tom Zachary for a Yankees 4–2 victory. Ruth's 60-HR season-record would not be broken for 34 years.

October
October 2 – Harry Heilmann goes seven-for-nine with a walk in a double header on the final day of the season, as he won his fourth American League batting championship – and led both leagues – with a .398 average. One more hit during the season would have raised his average to .400 for the second time in his career, as Heilmann had hit .403 in 1923.
October 5 – Two errors by the Pittsburgh Pirates lead to three unearned runs as the New York Yankees take game one of the 1927 World Series, 5–4.
October 6 – Once again, sloppy play by the Pittsburgh Pirates helps the Yankees cruise to a game two victory as they score runs on an error, wild pitch and hit batsman.
October 7 – A three-run home run by Babe Ruth caps off a six-run seventh inning as the Yankees cruise to an 8–1 victory in game three of the World Series.
October 8 – The New York Yankees defeat the Pittsburgh Pirates, 4–3, in Game 4 of the World Series, to win their second World Championship, four games to none. This was the first sweep by an American League team over the rival National League. Babe Ruth's fifth-inning home run gives the Yankees a 3–1 lead, but Pittsburgh ties the game later. In the top of the ninth inning, Earle Combs walks, Mark Koenig hits a bunt single, and Ruth walks to fill the bases. Two outs later, a wild pitch rolls far enough away for Combs to score the winning run.

November
November 28 – Billy Evans quits as American League umpire to become business manager of the Cleveland Indians, following the purchase of the club by a group headed by Alva Bradley, to become the first general manager in major league history. Evans, who worked as an AL umpire from 1906 to 1927, became, at age 22, the youngest umpire in major league history, and later became the youngest to officiate in the World Series at age 25.

December
December 2 – The Detroit Tigers send outfielder Heinie Manush along with first baseman Lu Blue to the St. Louis Browns in exchange for shortstop Chick Galloway, outfielder Harry Rice and pitcher Elam Vangilder.

Births

January
January 1 – Marion Hosbein
January 1 – Carl Scheib
January 3 – Chris Van Cuyk
January 8 – Jim Busby
January 16 – Maybelle Blair
January 17 – Tom Cooper
January 21 – Danny O'Connell
January 26 – Bob Nieman
January 28 – Carlos Bernier
January 28 – Margaret Holgerson

February
February 2 – Doris Sams
February 2 – Fred Waters
February 6 – Smoky Burgess
February 7 – Joe Lonnett
February 7 – Al Richter
February 13 – Jim Brideweser
February 15 – Buddy Hicks
February 18 – Luis Arroyo
February 18 – Herm Wehmeier

March
March 9 – Jackie Jensen
March 16 – Clint Courtney
March 19 – Richie Ashburn
March 20 – Earlene Risinger
March 20 – Jim Willis
March 21 – Bernie Creger
March 21 – Owen Friend
March 22 – Paul Stuffel
March 23 – Johnny Logan
March 27 – Dick Rozek

April
April 2 – Billy Pierce
April 3 – Janet Jamieson
April 4 – Don Hasenmayer
April 6 – Jim Romano
April 8 – Charlie Maxwell
April 11 – Jack Faszholz
April 14 – Don Mueller
April 24 – Frank Lucchesi
April 26 – Granny Hamner
April 26 – Bob Zick

May
May 1 – Betty Luna
May 4 – Hal Hudson
May 9 – Ray Katt
May 9 – Audrey Haine
May 13 – Dusty Rhodes
May 17 – Jim McDonald
May 18 – Esther Lyman
May 19 – Bill Antonello
May 21 – El Tappe
May 24 – Milt Jordan
May 26 – Dutch Romberger
May 26 – Elizabeth Wicken

June
June 15 – Ben Flowers
June 18 – Irv Medlinger
June 21 – Jackie Collum
June 28 – Dick Lane
June 28 – Ellen Tronnier

July
July 7 – Hal Keller
July 7 – Sammy White
July 10 - Paul Pryor
July 12 – Jack Harshman
July 13 – Rubén Gómez
July 19 – Billy Gardner
July 21 – Dick Smith
July 23 – Virgil Jester
July 24 – Preston Ward
July 26 – Bill Miller
July 30 – Virginia Bell
July 31 – Al Aber
July 31 – Billy Shantz

August
August 3 – Dick Welteroth
August 5 – Rocky Krsnich
August 7 – Rocky Bridges
August 7 – Art Houtteman
August 8 – Johnny Temple
August 10 – Bob Chakales
August 12 – Charlie White
August 18 – Roger Bowman
August 25 – Jim Suchecki
August 30 – Gordon Goldsberry

September
September 1 – Cloyd Boyer
September 1 – Tom Burgess
September 1 – Bob DiPietro
September 2 – Milo Hamilton
September 10 – Brandy Davis
September 13 – Jenny Romatowski
September 14 – Jim Fanning
September 14 – Dave Hillman
September 15 – Duke Simpson
September 19 – Bill Sarni
September 21 – Jim Clark
September 22 – Tommy Lasorda
September 26 – Kathryn Vonderau
September 27 – Genevieve George
September 27 – Tom Kirk
September 30 – Ben Taylor

October
October 3 – Bill Harrington
October 4 – Bob Kelly
October 5 – Al Heist
October 6 – Bethany Goldsmith
October 12 – Mary Butcher
October 12 – Doc Daugherty
October 12 – Peggy Fenton
October 15 – Bill Henry
October 17 – Johnny Klippstein
October 18 – Marv Rotblatt
October 24 – Jim Greengrass
October 24 – Cal Hogue
October 20 – Emilio Cueche
October 30 – Joe Adcock

November
November 1 – Vic Power
November 2 – Davey Williams
November 3 – Fred Richards
November 4 – Carl Sawatski
November 5 – Putsy Caballero
November 7 – Hiroshi Yamauchi
November 12 – Harry Hanebrink
November 17 – Dick Weik
November 21 – Norene Arnold
November 26 – Pete Taylor
November 27 – Frank Quinn
November 28 – Carlos Paula
November 29 – Vin Scully

December
December 6 – Tommy Brown
December 7 – Dick Donovan
December 11 – Johnny Gray
December 21 – Jack Daniels
December 23 – Tony Roig
December 25 – Nellie Fox
December 26 – Stu Miller
December 26 – Danny Schell
December 27 – Audrey Wagner

Deaths

January
January 13 – Bob Ingersoll, 44, pitcher for the 1914 Cincinnati Reds.
January 27 – Drummond Brown, 41, pitcher from 1912 to 1914 for the National League Boston Braves and the Kansas City Packers of the Federal League.

February
February 11 – Bobby Rothermel, 56, infielder who played with the 1899 Baltimore Orioles.
February 13 – Vive Lindaman, 49, pitcher for the Boston Doves/Beaneaters of the National League from 1906 to 1909.
February 17 – Harry Little, 76, outfielder/second baseman for the St. Louis Brown Stockings and Louisville Grays of the National League during the 1877 season.
February 19 – Katsy Keifer, 35, pitcher for the 1914 Indianapolis Hoosiers of the Federal League.
February 21 – Ike Rockenfield, 50, second baseman for the St. Louis Browns of the American League in the 1905 and 1906 seasons.
February 24 – Charlie Bennett, 72, star catcher whose career was ended when a train accident cost him his legs.

March
March 4 – Horace Wilson, 84, American professor of English at Tokyo University during the modernization of Japan after the Meiji Restoration, who is credited with introducing baseball to Japan in either 1872 or 1873.
March 6 – John Tilley, 72, left fielder for the Cleveland Blues, Toledo BlueStockings and St. Paul WhiteCaps in parts of two seasons spanning 1882–1884.
March 16 – Jake Wells, 63, catcher and left fielder for the 1888 Detroit Wolverines and the 1890 St. Louis Browns.
March 27 – Joe Start, 84, prominent first baseman of the 1860s and 1870s.

April
April 1 – Ben Harris, 37, pitcher for the Kansas City Packers of the Federal League from 1914 to 1915.
April 2 – Mike Lynch, 46, pitcher for the Pittsburgh PIrates and New York Giants from 1904 through 1907.
April 7 – Billy Alvord, 63, third baseman for five seasons from 1885 to 1893.
April 7 – Ray Miller, 39, pitcher for the Cleveland Indians and the Pittsburgh Pirates in 1917.
April 13 – Kirtley Baker, 57, National League pitcher for the Pittsburgh Alleghenys, Baltimore Orioles and Washington Senators in parts of five seasons spanning 1890–1899.
April 13 – Tommy Johns, 75, left fielder for the Baltimore Marylands of the National Association during the 1873 season.
April 18 – Pop Smith, 70, infielder for 12 seasons from 1880 to 1891.
April 26 – Bill Gannon, 54, outfielder for the Chicago Orphans of the National League in 1901.

May
May 3 – Otto Schomberg, 62, first baseman and right fielder for the 1886 Pittsburgh Alleghenys of the American Association and the 1887-88 Indianapolis Hoosiers of the National League.
May 16 – Pat Murphy, 70, backup catcher who played from 1887 through 1890 for the New York Giants of the National League.
May 18 – Patrick O'Loughlin, 67, Irish outfielder who appeared in one game for the 1883 Baltimore Orioles of the American Association.
May 26 – Herm Merritt, 26, shortstop for the 1921 Detroit Tigers of the American League.

June
June 7 – Pat Griffin, 34, pitcher for the 1914 Cincinnati Reds of the National League.
June 18 – Jack Harper, 33, pitcher for the 1915 Philadelphia Athletics of the American League.

August
August 6 – Chick Pedroes, 57, Cuban outfielder in two games for the 1902 Chicago Cubs of the National League.
August 8 – Billy Gilbert, 51, second baseman for four different teams from 1901 through 1909, and member of the 1905 New York Giants World Champion team.
August 16 – Jerry Denny, 68, third baseman for seven National League teams in 13 seasons spanning 1881–94.
August 22 – Mike Shea, 60, pitcher in two games for the 1887 Cincinnati Red Stockings of the American Association.
August 25 – Harry Cheek, 48, backup catcher for the 1910 Philadelphia Phillies of the National League.

September
September 6 – Lave Cross, 61, third baseman and catcher for over 20 seasons, captain of the 1902 and 1905 AL champion Philadelphia Athletics, and one of the first ten players to collect 2,500 hits.
September 27 – Ben Hunt, 38, pitched for the Red Sox and Cardinals in the early 1910s.
September 30 – Hank Morrison, 61, pitcher for the 1887 Indianapolis Hoosiers of the National League.

October
October 4 – John Richter, 54, third baseman for the 1898 Louisville Colonels of the National League.
October 11 – Mike Corcoran, 69, pitcher in one game for the 1884 Chicago White Stockings of the National League.
October 14 – Ed Hughes, 47, pitcher for the Boston Americans of the American League in the 1905 and 1906 seasons.
October 22 – Ross Youngs, 30, Hall of Fame right fielder who hit a career .322 batting average for the New York Giants over 10 seasons from 1917 to 1926, which included four National League pennants and two World Series championships in 1921 and 1922.
October 25 – Tom Brown, 67, outfielder who played from 1892 through 1898 for nine teams in four different leagues, collecting 1951 hits in 1788 games, while managing two seasons for the 1897–1898 Washington Senators, and umpiring three full seasons.

November
November 7 – Ed Clark, 64, pitcher for the 1886 Philadelphia Athletics of the American Association,
November 8 – Phil Bedgood, 29, pitcher from 1922 to 1923 for the Cleveland Indians of the American League.
November 22 – John McGlone, 66, third baseman for the 1886 Washington Senators of the National League and the 1887-88  Cleveland Blues of the American Association.
November 30 – Jimmy Wood, 84, player/manager for the Chicago White Stockings, Troy Haymakers, Brooklyn Eckfords and Philadelphia White Stockings from 1871 to 1873, who hit .333 in 102 games and posted a 105–99 managerial record.

December
December 1 – Danny Shay, 51, shortstop for the Cleveland Blues, St. Louis Cardinals and New York Giants in parts of four seasons spanning 1901–07.
December 1 – Germany Smith, 64, shortstop who played from 1884 through 1898 for seven different teams, most notably for the Brooklyn Grays/Bridegrooms during seven seasons.
December 17 – Bill Gilbert, 59, pitcher for the 1892 Baltimore Orioles of the National League.
December 24 – Al Myers, 64, second baseman who played from 1894 to 1891 for five teams, most prominently with the Washington Nationals of the National League.
December 31 – Jack Sharrott, 58, pitcher/outfielder who posted a 20–17 record with a 3.12 ERA and a .237 batting average for the New York Giants and Philadelphia Phillies from 1890 to 1893.